Areej Tayseer Zarrouq is a female Sudanese film director, writer and producer. She is a member of the Sudan Film Factory in Khartoum, an independent cultural platform, promoting training, production and the promotion of cinema in Sudan.

Zarrouq received her BA in media studies from City University Cairo. Her short documentary film Orange Tint (2010), made with the help of the Goethe Institute in Khartoum, examined a day in the life of a group of Sudanese girls in Khartoum. It talked of their unconventional views.

Filmography
 Orange tint, 2010. 26 min.

References

External links
 

Year of birth missing (living people)
Living people
Sudanese film directors
Sudanese film producers
Sudanese screenwriters
Sudanese women film directors